This article contains lists of achievements in major senior-level international field hockey and indoor field hockey tournaments according to first-place, second-place and third-place results obtained by teams representing different nations. The objective is not to create combined medal tables; the focus is on listing the best positions achieved by teams in major international tournaments, ranking the nations according to the most podiums accomplished by teams of these nations.

Results 
For the making of these lists, results from following major international tournaments were consulted:

 FIH: International Hockey Federation
 IOC: International Olympic Committee
 IWGA: International World Games Association

Medals for the demonstration events are NOT counted. Medals earned by athletes from defunct National Olympic Committees (NOCs) or historical teams are NOT merged with the results achieved by their immediate successor states. The International Olympic Committee (IOC) do NOT combine medals of these nations or teams.

The tables are pre-sorted by total number of first-place results, second-place results and third-place results, then most first-place results, second-place results, respectively. When equal ranks are given, nations are listed in alphabetical order.

Field hockey and indoor field hockey

Men and women 

*Defunct National Olympic Committees (NOCs) or historical teams are shown in italic.
†Non International Olympic Committee (IOC) members.

Men 

*Defunct National Olympic Committees (NOCs) or historical teams are shown in italic.
†Non International Olympic Committee (IOC) members.

Women 

*Defunct National Olympic Committees (NOCs) or historical teams are shown in italic.
†Non International Olympic Committee (IOC) members.

Field hockey

Men and women 

*Defunct National Olympic Committees (NOCs) or historical teams are shown in italic.
†Non International Olympic Committee (IOC) members.

Men 

*Defunct National Olympic Committees (NOCs) or historical teams are shown in italic.
†Non International Olympic Committee (IOC) members.

Women 

*Defunct National Olympic Committees (NOCs) or historical teams are shown in italic.
†Non International Olympic Committee (IOC) members.

Indoor field hockey

Men and women

Men

Women

See also 
 FIH World Rankings
 Major achievements in Olympic team ball sports by nation
 List of major achievements in sports by nation

References

General 
Official results
 Field hockey
 Olympic tournament: Event homepage
 Men's: 1908 1920 1928 1932 1936 1948 1952 1956 1960 1964 1968 1972 1976 1980 1984 1988 1992 1996 2000 2004 2008 2012 2016
 Women's: 1980 1984 1988 1992 1996 2000 2004 2008 2012 2016
 World Cup: Event homepage
 Men's: 1971 1973 1975 1978 1982 1986 1990 1994 1998 2002 2006 2010 2014 2018
 Women's: 1974 1976 1978 1981 1983 1986 1990 1994 1998 2002 2006 2010 2014 2018
 Hockey Champions Trophy: Event homepage
 Men's: 1978 1980 1981 1982 1983 1984 1985 1986 1987 1988 1989 1990 1991 1992 1993 1994 1995 1996 1997 1998 1999 2000 2001 2002 2003 2004 2005 2006 2007 2008 2009 2010 2011 2012 2014 2016 2018
 Women's: 1987 1989 1991 1993 1995 1997 1999 2000 2001 2002 2003 2004 2005 2006 2007 2008 2009 2010 2011 2012 2014 2016 2018
 FIH Pro League: Event homepage
 FIH Hockey World League: Event homepage
 Men's: 2012–13 2014–15 2016–17
 Women's: 2012–13 2014–15 2016–17
 Indoor field hockey
 Indoor Hockey World Cup: Event homepage
 Men's: 2003 2007 2011 2015 2018
 Women's: 2003 2007 2011 2015 2018

Specific

External links 
 International Hockey Federation (FIH) – official website

Field hockey
Achievements